Israel Abrahan Pineda (born April 3, 2000) is a Venezuelan professional baseball catcher for the Washington Nationals of Major League Baseball (MLB). He made his MLB debut in 2022.

Career

A native of Maracay, Pineda signed with Washington as an international amateur free agent in 2016 for a reported $450,000 bonus. He made his professional debut for the Gulf Coast League Nationals in 2017 and advanced to the New York–Penn League's Auburn Doubledays in 2018. He was named a New York–Penn League All-Star during the 2018 season, hitting .273 with four home runs during the short season.

By midway through the 2018 season, Pineda was generating some buzz as a rising prospect in the Nationals organization, with a Mid-Atlantic Sports Network writer suggesting he was on track to becoming a top-five organizational prospect. Before the 2019 season, Pineda was ranked by MLB Pipeline as the Nationals' eighth-best prospect and top overall catching prospect. He did not play a minor league game in 2020 due to the cancellation of the minor league season caused by the COVID-19 pandemic.

In 2021, Pineda participated in major league spring training with the Nationals, hitting a home run in his final game. He was assigned to the High-A Wilmington Blue Rocks to begin the season. Pineda was used as a "taxi squad" player by the Surprise Saguaros of the Arizona Fall League in 2021, one of eight Nationals prospects assigned to Surprise.

Pineda advanced rapidly in the 2022 season, rising from High-A Wilmington to the Double-A Harrisburg Senators and then the Triple-A Rochester Red Wings. After Nationals catcher Keibert Ruiz was injured, Pineda was selected to the roster for the first time, making his major league debut and first career start against the Philadelphia Phillies on September 11, 2022.

References

External links

2000 births

Living people
People from Maracay
Major League Baseball players from Venezuela
Major League Baseball catchers
Washington Nationals players
Gulf Coast Nationals players
Auburn Doubledays players
Hagerstown Suns players
Wilmington Blue Rocks players
Harrisburg Senators players
Rochester Red Wings players
Surprise Saguaros players